Dürrbach is a river of Thuringia, Germany, a tributary of the Orla.

See also

List of rivers of Thuringia

Rivers of Thuringia
Rivers of Germany